Tyndrum railway station may refer to one of two stations in the town of Tyndrum, Scotland:

 Tyndrum Lower railway station, on the Oban line
 Upper Tyndrum railway station, on the Fort William line